Trotti is a surname. Notable people with it include:

Carlo Trotti (d. 1612), Roman Catholic bishop
Constance Trotti (1800–1871), Belgian noble
Euclide Trotti, Italian painter
Giovanni Battista Trotti (1555–1612), Italian painter
Lamar Trotti (1900–1952), American screenwriter, producer and motion picture executive
Lorenzo Trotti (1633–1700), Roman Catholic archbishop
Samuel W. Trotti (1810–1856), American politician
Sandro Trotti (born 1934), Italian painter

Other uses
 Trotti, Texas, an unincorporated community